is a retired yakuza. The US Treasury department put him on a watch-list in December 2015 and he is still engaged in criminal activity. He is also considered  to be bankrolling the Kobe Yamaguchi-gumi which split from the 100 year old Yamaguchi-gumi, Japan's largest crime group, on August 27, 2015.  He was the founding head of the Goto-gumi, a Fujinomiya-based affiliate of Japan's largest yakuza syndicate, the Yamaguchi-gumi.

Goto, who has been convicted at least nine times, was a prominent yakuza and at one point the most powerful crime boss in Tokyo, even being dubbed the "John Gotti of Japan". Goto was once claimed to have been the largest shareholder in Japan Airlines, but this was disputed by stock exchange filings.

He had been barred from entering the United States until 2001 when he got a special visa deal from the FBI for a life-saving liver transplant at a time of pronounced organ scarcity.

Career overview
According to his autobiography, Goto was born in Ebara, Tokyo, as the youngest of four brothers. After the beginning of the Pacific War, of World War II, he moved to his father's hometown Fujinomiya, Shizuoka at age two when his mother died. He was raised by his grandmother and grew up in poverty.

After a period as a street thug in Fujinomiya, his yakuza career officially began in 1972, at age 28, when he joined a tertiary Yamaguchi-affiliate based in Fujinomiya. Goto was rapidly promoted, and in 1985 he formed his own yakuza group, the Goto-gumi, in Fujinomiya as a secondary affiliate of the Yamaguchi-gumi. He entered the Kobe headquarters of the Yamaguchi-gumi in its 4th era (1984–1985), and had been in the headquarters until 2008 when he was expelled.

FBI scandal
In 2001, after dealing with the FBI, he entered the United States to receive a liver transplant, and gave a $100,000 donation to the UCLA Medical Center in Los Angeles. Goto got his new liver, from a queue-jumping transplant, in a year when 186 people in the Los Angeles region died waiting for a liver.

The Los Angeles hospital provided altogether four Japanese gang figures with liver transplants over a period when several hundred local patients died while awaiting transplants. Goto continued to receive medical care from his world-renowned liver surgeon Dr. Ronald Busuttil in Japan. Busuttil flew to Japan and examined Goto on more than one occasion, said Goto’s Tokyo-based lawyer, Yoshiyuki Maki - and evaluated Goto while he was in custody in 2006.

Although the FBI would want some crucial information about the Yamaguchi-gumi's activities in the United States, Goto provided little useful information, according to a retired chief of the FBI's Asian criminal enterprise unit in Washington, however it included a clue about some activities of Susumu Kajiyama the "Emperor of Loan Sharks".

Retirement
Goto began disappearing from the yakuza scene in 2008 after allegedly being forced into retirement by the Kobe headquarters' ruling faction led by Kiyoshi Takayama of the Kodo-kai. His expulsion from the Yamaguchi-gumi was officially confirmed by the headquarters in October 2008. After retirement, he became a Buddhist priest, with his Buddhist name "Chuei" (忠叡).

Literature & Television

Autobiography 
Goto released his autobiography, Habakarinagara (lit. "while hesitating", roughly analogous to the western phrase "with all due respect" ), in May 2010. Habakarinagara had sold over 225,000 copies and went to number one in sales on various book-sales charts in Japan, by early 2011. All book royalties were donated to charity, Cambodia's "Angkor Association for the Disabled" and Myanmar's two Buddhist temples including "Mogok Vipassana Temple".
Angkor Association for the Disabled's official website has listed Goto as a major donor, with his Buddhist name "The Venerable Chyuei [Gotou]".

Tokyo Vice 
Goto was a major protagonist in reporter Jake Adelstein's 2009 memoir Tokyo Vice, which extensively details Goto's liver transplant and alleged criminal activity. In it, Aedelstein claims that his police and yakuza contacts warned him that Goto intended him to kill him for exposing his activities. In the HBO television series of the same name, Goto was the basis for the character Shinzo Tozawa (played by Ayumi Tanida).

US Treasury sanctions
In December 2015, Goto was named by the U.S. Department of the Treasury's Office of Foreign Assets Control as an individual with ongoing associations with the Japanese yakuza. Sanctions were imposed to effectively freeze all known assets held by Goto in the United States and to prohibit all U.S. persons from engaging in transactions with him.

References

Further reading
 Wolfgang Herbert, Dirk Dabrun: Japans Unterwelt: Reisen in das Reich der Yakuza. Reimer, Berlin, 2022. Reimer, Berlin. ISBN 978-3-496-03005-8, doi.org/10.5771/9783496030058

Japanese crime bosses
Yakuza members
Yamaguchi-gumi
People from Tokyo
People from Shizuoka Prefecture
1942 births
Living people
Liver transplant recipients